Lord Ivar Alexander Michael Mountbatten, DL (born 9 March 1963) is a British aristocrat, farmer, geologist and businessman. 

Although he is not a member of the British royal family proper, he is the first member of the British monarch's extended family openly in a same-sex relationship, and upon marrying his partner James Coyle in 2018 was the first to have a same-sex wedding.

Early life and family
Mountbatten was born in London, to David Mountbatten, 3rd Marquess of Milford Haven, and the former Janet Mercedes Bryce. His elder brother is George Mountbatten, 4th Marquess of Milford Haven. Queen Victoria was his great-great-great grandmother, and he is a descendant of Alexander Pushkin and Abram Gannibal. He is also a second cousin of King Charles III through both of their fathers.  His paternal grandfather was Prince George of Battenberg, through whom he is a morganatic descendant of the House of Hesse-Darmstadt.

Mountbatten was educated at Gordonstoun School, the same school attended by Prince Philip and Charles III, and he graduated from Middlebury College in Vermont with a BA degree.

Personal life
Mountbatten married Penelope Anne Vere Thompson (born Salisbury, Wiltshire, 17 March 1966), only daughter of Colin Graham Thompson of Old Manor House, Sutton Veny, Wiltshire, and his wife Rosemary Vere Edwardes. The ceremony took place on 23 April 1994 at the Church of Saint Peter and Saint Paul in Clare, Suffolk. They have three daughters:

 Ella Louise Georgina Mountbatten (born Cambridge, Cambridgeshire, 20 March 1996) – goddaughter of Prince Edward, Duke of Edinburgh.
 Alexandra 'Alix' Nada Victoria Mountbatten (born Bridwell Park, Uffculme, Devon, 8 May 1998) – goddaughter of Sophie, Duchess of Edinburgh.
 Louise 'Luli' Xenia Rose Mountbatten (born Bridwell Park, 30 July 2002).

The couple separated in September 2010 and divorced amicably in November 2011, after 17 years of marriage. In 2015, he converted their former home, Bridwell Park, into an exclusive-use venue for weddings, corporate functions, and business events.

In September 2016, Mountbatten revealed that he was in a relationship with James Coyle, an airline cabin services director whom he met while at a ski resort in Verbier. On 22 September 2018 they were married in a private ceremony on Mountbatten's estate of Bridwell Park. Mountbatten's former wife walked him down the aisle and 'gave him away' at the suggestion of their children.

Mountbatten is one of the godparents of Lady Louise Windsor (born 2003), the daughter of Prince Edward and his wife Sophie.

References 

Mountbatten, Lord Ivar
Mountbatten, Lord Ivar
Mountbatten, Lord Ivar
Ivar
British people of Russian descent
British people of Polish descent
English LGBT people
Deputy Lieutenants of Devon
People educated at Heatherdown School
Middlebury College alumni
People educated at Gordonstoun
LGBT nobility